Burtsevka is a rural locality (a village) in Duvansky Selsoviet, Duvansky District, Bashkortostan, Russia. The population was 39 as of 2010. There is 1 street.

Geography 
Burtsevka is located 73 km west of Mesyagutovo (the district's administrative centre) by road. Komsomolsky is the nearest rural locality.

References 

Rural localities in Duvansky District